Jakobi is a surname and may refer to:

Allan Jakobi of Apelsin, an Estonian band created in 1974 by Tõnu Aare
Paula O. Jakobi (1870–1960), American suffragist and playwright
Robert Jakobi (born 1985), Food entrepreneur
Viktor Jakobi (1883–1921), Hungarian operetta composer

See also
German destroyer Z5 Paul Jakobi, Type 1934A-class destroyer built for Nazi Germany's Kriegsmarine in the mid-1930s
Jakob (disambiguation)
Jakobid